Tosia australis is a species of starfish belonging to the family Goniasteridae. It is native to Australia, New Zealand, and South Africa.

References

External links 
 

Goniasteridae